Ayumi Hamasaki 21st Anniversary: Power of A^3 is Japanese pop singer Ayumi Hamasaki's 42nd video release. It was released on September 4, 2019.
The concert was a special live that was held twice at Saitama Super Arena on April 6 and 7, 2019 to close out her 20th anniversary year.

The DVD peaked at No. 2 on the weekly Oricon DVD Chart, while the Blu-ray reached No. 7.

While Hamasaki had gone on a variety of concert tours following her Arena Tour 2016, this marks her first standalone release of a concert in 3 years.

Release
The performance on April 7, 2019, was recorded for the release, which came out in four versions. The different formats include a DVD version, a Blu-ray version, a DVD + Goods + Sumapura version and a Blu-ray + Goods + Sumapura version. The latter two were limited TeamAyu/mu-mo editions, which included a special bonus bag.

Track list
Track list taken from Avex.

DVD/Blu-ray

Charts

References

2019 video albums
Ayumi Hamasaki video albums
Avex Group video albums